Compound 48/80 is a polymer produced by the condensation of N-methyl-p-methoxyphenethylamine with formaldehyde. It promotes histamine release, and in biochemical research, compound 48/80 is used to promote mast cell degranulation.

References

Organic polymers